Michael Moorer vs. George Foreman, billed as One for the Ages, was a professional boxing match contested on November 5, 1994 for the WBA and IBF heavyweight championships.

Background
On April 22, 1994, Moorer defeated Evander Holyfield by decision to wrest the title, which Holyfield had regained from Riddick Bowe in his previous bout, from the two-time champion. Foreman, at 45, had been on the comeback trail for several years after choosing to end his ten-plus year retirement. He had received a shot at Holyfield's undisputed world championship in 1991 but was defeated on points, not by knockout or technical knockout. Foreman also had not fought since being defeated by Tommy Morrison for the then-fringe World Boxing Organization championship in June 1993.

There were talks about Moorer possibly meeting WBC Heavyweight Champion Lennox Lewis in a match that would once again unify the three major heavyweight titles, but Moorer rejected the idea, stating that he didn't have the desire to do so. Foreman then issued a challenge to the newly crowned champion, and his status as one of the most popular fighters in the sport along with the promise of a big payday led to Moorer ultimately accepting Foreman's challenge. The fight was scheduled for November 5, 1994.

However, the fight almost did not take place. The WBA did not have Foreman ranked on its list of contenders and was thus not willing to sanction the bout. The IBF, which installed Foreman as its eighth-ranked contender, did offer sanctioning, but the WBA warned Moorer that regardless of what happened, he would be stripped of their championship if he went forward with the Foreman fight. Thus, his promoters at Main Events announced on August 10 that the fight was cancelled. 

Foreman and his promoter Bob Arum of Top Rank responded to the decision by filing a lawsuit in a Nevada state court on August 15. The suit alleged that the WBA colluded with others to discriminate against the 45-year old Foreman and to force Moorer and Main Events to honor the contract they had signed, with the demand that the champion not be allowed to step in the ring until they did. On August 20, the complainants won an injunction against the WBA. The presiding judge said the organization acted "capriciously" in not sanctioning the fight, and as long as he obtained medical clearance from Nevada doctors Foreman would be eligible to fight for the WBA title.

Media
The fight was broadcast by HBO and aired as part of their long running series, HBO World Championship Boxing. Jim Lampley provided the blow-by-blow, with Larry Merchant as analyst and Harold Lederman as the unofficial ringside scorekeeper. At the time, Foreman was a second analyst alongside Merchant, but since he was participating in the fight Gil Clancy took his place.

Officials
Joe Cortez, a veteran of nearly 900 fights in his career, was the referee for the bout. He had already refereed five world championship fights in 1994 alone.

The ringside judges were Chuck Giampa, Jerry Roth, and Duane Ford.

The Fight
Foreman said after the fight that he was out to lay his ghost from the Rumble in the Jungle to rest, referring to the legendary fight twenty years beforehand in Kinshasa, Zaire (now Democratic Republic of Congo) where Muhammad Ali had overcome a previously undefeated Foreman and knocked him out in the eighth round (which remains Foreman's only loss by knockout) to win the heavyweight title that Foreman had held after defeating Joe Frazier in 1973 in Kingston, Jamaica by knocking him down six times in two rounds. Not only did Foreman wear the same red trunks that he had worn in Zaire, but in his corner was Ali's legendary trainer Angelo Dundee, who had been in Ali's corner for that fight.

Moorer controlled the pace of the fight from the beginning and kept winning rounds. Foreman took a significant number of jabs to the face, which began to take a toll later in the fight as one of his eyes nearly swelled shut. In spite of the physical pounding Moorer was giving him, Foreman remained on his feet. As noted, he had only been stopped once in his career in the fight with Ali. In addition, only Ali, Jimmy Young and Ron Lyle had been able to knock him off his feet during the course of his career. 

Despite his ability to take whatever Moorer was throwing at him, Foreman appeared on the way to yet another defeat in a world championship fight. After the ninth round, judges Roth and Giampa had given seven rounds to Moorer and had him up 88-83. Judge Ford's scorecard was a little closer, as he scored the bout 86-85 in favor of the champion with Foreman winning two additional rounds on his card. Knowing where his fighter stood, Dundee told Foreman just before he sent him out for the tenth round that it was going to take a knockout to win and that the time to get it had come.

Meanwhile, in the champion’s corner, his trainer Teddy Atlas had picked up on what Foreman would later say what he had made his major strategy during the fight. Atlas told Moorer that Foreman was landing his best shots in close quarters, and Foreman was throwing a quick series of combinations starting with a jab, which he used to break through Moorer’s guard, and then following that up with a quick right cross. Atlas advised Moorer to stand back and make Foreman come to him. 

Early in the round, Foreman landed a body shot that slowed the champion down. From there, he began to land his jab/cross combination with more consistency. By the midway point of the round, Foreman was starting to gain the upper hand on Moorer and had landed several effective combinations. Moorer continued to stay near Foreman, which went against his trainer’s instructions and eventually led to Foreman landing a hard right flush on the champion’s jaw. Moorer dropped onto his back, stunned, and did not move until Cortez reached a count of seven. The champion tried but could not reach his feet before the count of ten, and Foreman won the bout and the championship. 

Years later, when the fight was featured as part of HBO's Legendary Nights documentary series chronicling memorable fights broadcast by the network, Foreman said that his strategy was to let Moorer fight his usual fight while waiting for him to slip up. He felt that if he was able to wait, Moorer would leave himself open for a combination that would allow Foreman to knock him out. Foreman went further saying that was how he dreamed the situation would present itself. Moorer dismissed Foreman's recollection of the events, instead repeatedly saying he got "lucky".

Records
At 45 years and 360 days, Foreman beat Jersey Joe Walcott's old record by eight years, and he had also become the first man to regain a world boxing title twenty years after losing it - and on top of that, no heavyweight champion had beaten an opponent 19 years his junior to win a title. Boxing analysts and fans alike remarked on how Foreman had exorcised his old ghost in more ways than one - he had upset Moorer in a way similar to how Ali had stunned a younger Foreman in Zaire, using toughness, savvy and an ability to summon power at critical moments to overcome youth, speed and power.

Aftermath
After his victory, Foreman hoped for a potential superfight with Mike Tyson once Tyson was released from prison, however the WBA demanded that he face mandatory challenger and former world champion Tony Tucker. Tucker, at the time, was promoted by Don King, and Foreman was unwilling to get himself involved with King or his fighters. Thus, he refused to fight Tucker and was stripped of the WBA championship. 

Foreman instead pursued a fight with German Axel Schulz for the IBF title, which he won by majority decision. However, there was significant controversy in the decision as many saw Schulz as having won the fight and a rematch was ordered. Foreman refused to give Schulz the match, as he was seeking other opportunities including rematches with Moorer or Holyfield or a match with former undisputed champion Riddick Bowe. Therefore, on June 28, 1995, Foreman relinquished the IBF championship. Foreman was still recognized as the lineal champion as well as the champion of the fringe World Boxing Union, and continued to hold that recognition until Shannon Briggs defeated him in 1997 in what would prove to be his final fight. 

Moorer, meanwhile, got a chance to regain a portion of the heavyweight championship in early 1996. A match between Schulz and Francois Botha to resolve the vacancy of the IBF title ended with a Botha victory, but a positive steroid test by Botha resulted in the result being changed to a no contest and the title once again being vacated. A bout was signed between Moorer and Schulz, and in a close match Moorer was able to recapture the IBF title by split decision. He would defend the title twice, knocking out Botha on the same night that Holyfield knocked Tyson out to win the WBA title, then going on to win a close fight against Vaughn Bean. Moorer then fought Holyfield in a title unification match and was knocked out in eight rounds, being dropped five times. Following that fight, he took a three-year retirement from the ring; he would finally retire in 2007.

Foreman settled back into life as a preacher, author, pitchman and motivational speaker in Houston. Two years after his second and final retirement, Salton Inc. paid over $137 million to buy out the right to use his name on the George Foreman Grill, and it is estimated that he has made over $200 million related to the grill, which is more than he made in the ring. Foreman's 2023 biopic, Big George Foreman: The Miraculous Story of the Once and Future Heavyweight Champion of the World, depicts parts of the buildup to the fight and the fight itself in its trailer.

References

1994 in boxing
Boxing in Las Vegas
1994 in sports in Nevada
World Boxing Association heavyweight championship matches
International Boxing Federation heavyweight championship matches
November 1994 sports events in the United States
MGM Grand Garden Arena
Boxing on HBO